Konsumentombudsmannen v Gourmet AB (2001) C-405/98 is an EU law case, concerning the free movement of goods in the European Union.

Facts
Sweden banned advertisements for alcohol on the radio, TV and in magazines totally (with a few limited exceptions for magazines aimed solely at alcohol suppliers and traders). Sweden argued the measure was lawful because there had been a constant increase in wine sales, mostly imports, and additionally that the ban applied to all alcohol, whether Swedish or not, and so the ban did not have a disproportionate impact on importers.

Judgment

Advocate General Jacobs
AG Jacobs highlighted that Swedish producers dominated the strong beer market. This was shown by Gourmet's statistics. Ingrained consumer habits would favour national beer.

Court of Justice
The Court of Justice held the law infringed art 34 but it could be justified on public health grounds if it was proportionate. The ban having an effect on cross-border supply of advertising space breached TFEU art 56 on free movement of services, but this could again potentially be justified on grounds of public health. The court held that it was therefore the role of national courts to decide on a case-by-case basis whether the prohibition in question was proportionate.

Aftermath
In March 2002 the Stockholm District Court ruled that the ban was not proportionate to its objective, and resultingly incompatible with EU law. The judgement was appealed by the Consumer Ombudsman and in February 2004, the Swedish Market Court confirmed the District Court's judgement. The ban was resultingly lifted.

See also

European Union law
44 Liquormart, Inc. v. Rhode Island, 517 US 484 (1996)

Notes

References

European Union goods case law
2001 in case law
Alcohol law in Europe
Advertising regulation
Beer in Sweden
2001 in Sweden